Summer Song is a 1956 musical based on the visit of the Czech composer Antonin Dvorak to Iowa, where he wrote his symphony From the New World. The lyrics were written by Eric Maschwitz and book by Hy Kraft to music by Dvorak, arranged by Bernard Grun. Maschwitz had already worked with Grun on the Chopin musical Waltz Without End in 1942.

Summer Song opened in London in 1956 at the Prince's Theatre and ran for 148 performances.

Original cast recording
"Overture" – Orchestra
"Just Around The Corner" –Sally Ann Howes
"My Darling Karolka" – Sally Ann Howes
"Once A Year Is Not Enough" – Bonita Primrose
"Be She Dark, Be She Fair" – David Hughes (tenor)
"Cotton Tail" – Edric Connor
"No-One Told Me" – David Hughes
"Sing Me A Song" – chorus
"Murphy's Pig" – Bonita Primrose
"Saturday Girl" – David Hughes, Sally Ann Howes
"One Boy Sends You A Rose" – Sally Ann Howes, Bonita Primrose
"Dvorak's Letter Home" – Laurence Naismith
"Deep Blue Evening" – Edric Connor
"The Day You Hit The Highway" – Edric Connor
"Weddin' Gown" – Van Atkins, Bonita Primrose
"Summer Song" – Sally Ann Howes
"Small Town Sweetheart" – David Hughes
"New York '93" – chorus
"I'll Be Remembering" – Sally Ann Howes
"Finale" – David Hughes, Sally Ann Howes

References

1956 musicals
West End musicals